Western Kansas may refer to:

 The western part of Kansas
 West Kansas, proposed state
 Episcopal Diocese of Western Kansas